Marc Isaacs is a British documentary filmmaker, living in London. "Many of his 14 films to date have explored the divisions within the so-called 'United' Kingdom. He has probed multicultural life in London, traditionalist seaside backwaters, asylum-seekers and ex-pats in Calais, while venturing to Barking to gather white residents' attitudes towards their immigrant neighbours." Mike McCahill, in The Guardian, described Isaacs as a "people person, locating strangeness, melancholy and joy in the urban landscape, and those who inhabit it." His short film Lift (2001), which showed people using a lift in a tower block, was nominated for a BAFTA.

Life and work
Isaacs was born in the East End of London and grew up there in Redbridge. He studied at the University of East London. Some of his early work included assisting on Paweł Pawlikowski's films Twockers (1998) and Last Resort (2000).

For Lift (2001) he spent "weeks filming people getting in and out of a lift" in a tower block. Calais: The Last Border (2003) "weaves portraits of various individuals [. . .] into a moving and melancholy overview of a port defined more than ever by the island it gazes at across the Channel." All White in Barking (2007) is an "exploration of disparate attitudes in a melting pot town." For Outside the Court (2011), "Isaacs spent three months buttonholing smokers outside Highbury magistrates court, often interrupting them over their last fag before they went to meet their juridical fates." The Road: A Story of Life & Death (2012) is a "documentary about immigrants living at the London end of the A5". Outsiders (2014) is "set in a single location—the inside of a burger truck—this story unfolds as passersby answer Marc's questions while they slurp tea and eat bacon sandwiches. The result is an illuminating blend of anxiety and insecurity as attitudes towards outsiders begin to shine a light on why England is going through such politically turbulent times." The Men Who Sleep in Trucks (2016) depicts isolation and loneliness in Britain's truck drivers "sleeping in their own trucks in lay-by car parks and service stations". The Filmmaker's House (2020) "tackles Brexit and the future of a multicultural Britain head-on. [. . .] set over a day in Isaacs's comfortable family terraced home in Walthamstow, northeast London. It gathers strangers from various backgrounds who all live in its orbit".

Mike McCahill, film critic in The Guardian, described Isaacs as a "people person, locating strangeness, melancholy and joy in the urban landscape, and those who inhabit it." In an article for the British Film Institute, Isabel Stevens wrote that "many of his 14 films to date have explored the divisions within the so-called 'United' Kingdom. He has probed multicultural life in London, traditionalist seaside backwaters, asylum-seekers and ex-pats in Calais, while venturing to Barking to gather white residents' attitudes towards their immigrant neighbours." Corin Douieb, writing in Aesthetica in 2012 about the films All White in Barking, Men of the City and The Road, described Isaacs as having "continued to cast his eye over the maligned and tell their bleak stories".

Filmography
Lift (2001) – documentary short; directed and cinematography by Isaacs
Travellers (2003) – TV movie documentary; directed and cinematography by Isaacs
Calais: The Last Border (2003) – TV movie documentary; directed, cinematography, and produced by Isaacs
Philip and His Seven Wives (2005) – documentary; directed and cinematography by Isaacs
Someday My Prince Will Come (2005) – TV movie documentary; directed, cinematography, and produced by Isaacs
All White in Barking (2007) – documentary; written, directed and cinematography by Isaacs
Men of the City (2009) – documentary; written, directed and cinematography by Isaacs
Outside the Court (2011) – TV movie documentary; 1 hour, directed and cinematography by Isaacs
The Old Man and His Bed (2011) – short; directed by Isaacs
The Road: A Story of Life & Death (2012) – documentary; written, directed and cinematography by Isaacs, produced as part of the BBC's Storyville
Outsiders (2014) – short; directed by Isaacs
The Men Who Sleep in Trucks (2016) – documentary short; written, directed and produced by Isaacs
Touched by Murder (2016) – short; directed by Isaacs
Sisters (2017) – short; directed by Isaacs
Rainy Days (2017) – short; directed by Isaacs
Notes on Bangladesh (2017) – short; directed by Isaacs
Moments of Silence (2017) – short; directed and edited by Isaacs
The Filmmaker's House (2020) – documentary; written, directed, cinematography, edited and produced by Isaacs

Awards
2002: Lift was nominated for "Best New Director – Factual" at BAFTA's 2002 British Academy Television Craft Awards

Publications with contributions by Isaacs
This Much is True: 14 Directors on Documentary Filmmaking. London: A & C Black, 2012. . Includes an interview with Isaacs.

DVD and Blu-ray releases
Marc Isaacs Collection: Lift / Travellers / Calais: The Last Border: Three Films by Marc Isaacs (Second Run, 2009) – DVD
Marc Isaacs Collection: All White in Barking / Men of the City: Two Films by Marc Isaacs (Second Run, 2010) – DVD
The Road: A Story of Life and Death (2013) – DVD
Marc Isaacs Collection: Someday My Prince Will Come / Philip and His Seven Wives (Second Run, 2017) – DVD
From Lift to The Road The Films of Marc Isaacs (Second Run, 2018) – Blu-ray

Notes

References

External links

Lift (2001) on YouTube

English cinematographers
English documentary filmmakers
Film people from London
Alumni of the University of East London
Place of birth missing (living people)
Year of birth missing (living people)
Living people